The 2016 Pan American Ice Hockey Tournament was the third edition of the Pan American Ice Hockey Tournament, an annual event run by the Federación Deportiva de México de Hockey sobre Hielo, sanctioned by International Ice Hockey Federation. It took place in Mexico City, Mexico between June 6 and 12, 2016.

Participants

The following teams will compete in the competition, with both Mexico and Argentina bringing both an A team, and a B team. 

North America
  (host)
 

South America

Round-robin

Standings

Schedules
(UTC–06:00)

Final round

Bronze medal game
(UTC–06:00)

Gold medal game
(UTC–06:00)

Final standings

Statistics

References

Pan American Ice Hockey Tournament
Pan American Ice Hockey Tournament
2016
2016